Dotieas Agia F.C. is a Greek football club, based in Agia, Larissa.

The club was founded in 1960. They will play in the championship of Gamma Ethniki Greece for the 2022-23 season.

Football clubs in Thessaly
Sport in Larissa
Association football clubs established in 1960
1960 establishments in Greece